Kamel Hana Gegeo (c. 1960s – 18 October 1988) was an Iraqi Assyrian bodyguard, valet, and food taster of Saddam Hussein. He was murdered by Uday Hussein at a party hosted by Hosni Mubarak.

Career 
Gegeo was the personal bodyguard of the former president of Iraq, Saddam Hussein, and served as his valet and food taster. Gegeo is said to have introduced Saddam to his second wife, Samira Shahbandar, and arranged trysts between them, which led to a feud between Gegeo and Sajida Talfah, Saddam’s first wife, and Uday Hussein, who took it as an insult to his mother Sajida. Gegeo’s father, Hana Gegeo, was one of Saddam Hussein’s personal chefs, his mother was the nanny of Hala, one of Saddam’s daughters, and his brother, Malco Hana Gegeo, was a military man assigned by Saddam to form the Assyrian forces, which were then called the Assyrian regiment.

Death 

On 18 October 1988, Gegeo was murdered by Uday Hussein. During a party thrown in honour of Suzanne Mubarak, the wife of President Hosni Mubarak of Egypt, Uday Hussein bludgeoned Gegeo with a club in front of guests, and by some accounts, finally shot him to death, possibly acting on orders from his mother. Saddam was willing to punish Uday and arrest him for murder, but after multiple pleads by Sajida Talfah and Gegeo’s parents to pardon Uday, he exiled him to Switzerland instead of imprisoning him. Mubarak himself later called Uday a "psychopath".

See also 
 Saddam Hussein
 Tariq Aziz
 Uday Hussein
 Sajida Talfah 
 Samira Shahbandar

References

External links 

1918 births
1988 deaths
1988 murders in Asia
Iraqi Assyrian people
Iraqi Christians
Iraqi murder victims
Male murder victims
People murdered in Iraq
Place of birth missing
Victims of serial killers